Arnulfo is a masculine given name. It is the Spanish and Italian form of the German name Arnulf.

As a given name 

Arnulfo Aparri, Jr., Filipino murder suspect
Arnulfo Arias (1901–1988), Panamanian president
Arnulfo Fuentebella (b. 1945), Filipino lawyer
Arnulfo Mendoza (1954–2014), Mexican artist
Arnulfo Trejo (1922–2002), American librarian
Arnulfo Valentierra (b. 1978), Colombian footballer

As a surname 

 Pietro Arnulfo (b. 1988), Italian footballer

Masculine given names
Spanish masculine given names
Italian masculine given names